Çetin Güner (born 28 December 1977) is a retired Turkish-German football striker.

References

1977 births
Living people
German people of Turkish descent
Turkish footballers
Trabzonspor footballers
FC Basel players
Gaziantepspor footballers
Yimpaş Yozgatspor footballers
Diyarbakırspor footballers
Elazığspor footballers
Eskişehirspor footballers
Arsinspor footballers
Association football forwards
Swiss Super League players
Süper Lig players
Turkish expatriate footballers
Expatriate footballers in Switzerland
Turkish expatriate sportspeople in Switzerland
Expatriate footballers in Azerbaijan
Turkish expatriate sportspeople in Azerbaijan
Turkey under-21 international footballers
Borussia Dortmund non-playing staff